The following is a list of baseball stadiums (baseball parks) in South Korea with a seating capacity of 10,000 or more.

Current stadiums

See also 

 Baseball in South Korea
 List of sports venues in South Korea
 List of football stadiums in South Korea
 List of baseball parks by capacity

References 

Baseball stadiums
Baseball stadiums
Korea, South